Irene Elisabeth Maria Eijs (born 16 December 1966 in Wassenaar, South Holland) is a retired rower from the Netherlands, who won a bronze medal in the women's double sculls at the 1996 Summer Olympics in Atlanta, United States alongside Eeke van Nes.

References 
  Dutch Olympic Committee

1966 births
Living people
Dutch female rowers
Rowers at the 1992 Summer Olympics
Rowers at the 1996 Summer Olympics
Olympic rowers of the Netherlands
Olympic bronze medalists for the Netherlands
People from Wassenaar
Olympic medalists in rowing
Medalists at the 1996 Summer Olympics
Sportspeople from South Holland
20th-century Dutch women
21st-century Dutch women